Elijah Spencer (1775 in Columbia County, New York – December 15, 1852 in Benton, Yates County, New York) was an American politician from New York.

Biography
In 1791, he removed to Jerusalem, then in Ontario County, New York, settling in that part which was separated in 1803 as the Town of Vernon, later renamed the Town of Benton, and engaged in agricultural pursuits. He was Supervisor of the Town of Benton from 1810 to 1819. He was a member from Ontario County of the New York State Assembly in 1819.

Spencer was elected as a Democratic-Republican to the 17th United States Congress, holding office from December 3, 1821, to March 3, 1823. Afterwards he resumed his agricultural pursuits. He was again Supervisor of the Town of Benton from 1826 to 1828. He was the delegate from Yates County to the New York State Constitutional Convention of 1846.

He was buried at the Lake View Cemetery in Penn Yan, New York.

Sources

The New York Civil List compiled by Franklin Benjamin Hough (pages 59, 71, 195 and 306; Weed, Parsons and Co., 1858)

External links
 

1775 births
1852 deaths
People from Columbia County, New York
People from Benton, New York
Members of the New York State Assembly
Town supervisors in New York (state)
Democratic-Republican Party members of the United States House of Representatives from New York (state)
People from Jerusalem, New York
Burials at Lake View Cemetery (Penn Yan, New York)